The first government of Irakli Garibashvili was the government (cabinet) of Georgia, with Irakli Garibashvili as its head as the country's Prime Minister from November 20, 2013 until December 30, 2015. The cabinet mostly consisted of the members of the preceding Ivanishvili government, dominated by the Georgian Dream coalition, which had to win approval by the parliament after the October 2013 presidential election as envisaged by the recent constitutional amendments. Garibashvili was named by Bidzina Ivanishvili as his successor as Prime Minister on his voluntary resignation from the government. Garibashvili himself resigned in December 2015 and was succeeded by Giorgi Kvirikashvili.

List of ministers and portfolios

References

Government of Georgia (country)
2013 establishments in Georgia (country)
Cabinets established in 2013
Cabinets disestablished in 2015
2015 disestablishments in Georgia (country)